Dead Elvis is the debut album by British band Death in Vegas. It was released on 10 March 1997 in the United Kingdom and on 16 September 1997 in the United States. This was the only Death in Vegas album to feature original member Steve Hellier. The British release features coloured Elvis graffiti on the cover, while the US version features a tattoo artist. The music video for "Dirt" was a minor hit on MTV's 120 Minutes. "GBH" was featured on the soundtrack for the 1998 American comedy-thriller film Homegrown.

As of July 2013, it was certified silver by British Phonographic Industry for 60,000 sold units in UK.

Track listing
All tracks by Richard Fearless & Steve Hellier

 "All That Glitters" – 6:34
 "Opium Shuffle" – 5:02
 "GBH" – 5:09
 "Twist and Crawl" (bonus track not featured on all versions) – 4:59
 "Dirt" – 5:52
 "Rocco" – 6:34
 "Rekkit" – 6:27
 "I Spy" – 4:58
 "Amber" – 8:07
 "Rematerialised" – 8:21
 "68 Balcony" – 5:07
 "Sly" – 3:33

Bonus disc (Dead Elvis Remix Sessions)
In France only, initial copies of Dead Elvis came packaged with a 10-track bonus CD, titled Dead Elvis Remix Sessions.

 "Dirt" (Slayer mix) – 6:33
 "Rocco" (Dave Clarke mix) – 6:18
 "Twist and Crawl" (Full mix) – 4:57
 "Opium Shuffle" (Monkey Mafia mix) – 6:15
 "City Rub" – 6:22
 "Dirt" (Old School mix) – 5:29
 "Rocco" (Dub) – 6:35
 "Opium Shuffle" (Dead Elvis mix) – 5:14
 "Claiming Marilyn" – 5:41
 "Dirt" (Mullet mix) – 6:09

Track 8 is the same as the album version.

Singles
 "Dirt" (29 April 1996)
 "Rocco" (14 October 1996; reissued 13 October 1997)
 "Twist and Crawl" (14 April 1997)
 "Rekkit" (9 June 1997)

Samples
 "Dirt" contains samples from the MC at the Woodstock Festival addressing the crowd, as well as from "The 'Fish' Cheer / I-Feel-Like-I'm-Fixin'-to-Die Rag" by Country Joe & the Fish, and "Big Mama" by Roxanne Shante.
 "Rocco" contains a sample from "Moanin' Low" by Claire Trevor, from the film Key Largo (the main antagonist of the film is called Rocco). The sample can be heard explicitly in "Rocco (Dave Clarke mix)".
 "All That Glitters" contains a vocal sample from “Fonky Thang, Diamond' Rang” by The Dells, (Sweet As Funk Can Be LP) 1972.

Personnel
 Richard Fearless
 Steve Hellier – keyboards, programming
 Anthony Anderson – guitar
 Seamus Beaghen – hammond organ, fender rhodes
 Ranking Roger – vocals
 Paul Rutherford – trombone
 Selah – vocals
 Andy Visser – flute, harmonica, saxophone
 Mat Flint – bass
 Tim Weller – drums
 Steve Dub – engineer
 Luke Gordon – engineer, mixing
 Tim Holmes – engineer, mixing

Certifications

References

Death in Vegas albums
1997 debut albums
Big beat albums